Diodes may refer to:

 Diode, a device that is a two-terminal electronic component that conducts electric current in only one direction
 Diodes Incorporated, a global manufacturer and supplier of application specific standard products within the broad discrete, logic and analog semiconductor markets, publicly trading under the NASDAQ symbol DIOD
 The Diodes, a Canadian punk/new wave band